Elisa Bailly de Vilmorin (3 May 1826 – 5 August 1868) was a French horticulturist and plant breeder. She was married to Louis de Vilmorin.

Eponyms 
Several taxa were named after Elisa da Vilmorin:
 (Agavaceae) Agave vilmoriniana A.Berger
 (Asteraceae) Tithonia vilmoriniana Pamp. (now Tithonia rotundifolia)
 (Cornaceae) Davidia vilmoriniana 
 (Ericaceae) Erica vilmoriniana hort. ex Carrière
 (Fagaceae) Castanea vilmoriniana Dode
 (Juglandaceae) Juglans × vilmoriniana hort. Lavallee ex Vilm.
 (Oleaceae) Phillyrea vilmoriniana Boiss. & Balansa ex Boiss.
 (Primulaceae) Primula vilmoriniana Petitm. & Hand.-Mazz.
 (Rosaceae) Chaenomeles × vilmoriniana C.Weber
 (Saxifragaceae) Saxifraga vilmoriniana Engl. & Irmsch.
 (Simaroubaceae) Ailanthus vilmoriniana Dode
 (Violaceae) Viola vilmoriniana Delacour & Mottet

References

1868 deaths
French horticulturists
1826 births
Women horticulturists and gardeners
Horticulturists